Irving A. Aaronson (February 7, 1895 – March 10, 1963) was an American jazz pianist and big band leader. Aaronson's most popular song, "The Loveliest Night of the Year", was not recorded with his band but was adapted by Aaronson in 1950 for the Mario Lanza film The Great Caruso.

Early life and education
Aaronson was born in New York, United States.

He learned the piano from Alfred Sendry at the David Mannes School for music.

Career
By age 11, he played accompaniment in silent movie theaters (called nickelodeons). He co-wrote a hit song, "Boo-Hoo-Hoo", in 1921.

Aaronson's first band was called the Crusaders and recorded several sides for Edison Records. His band signed with the Victor label in 1926 and the band's name was changed to Irving Aaronson and his Commanders. While signed to Victor from 1926 to 1929, the band had a notable success with "Let's Misbehave" in 1927. The band appeared in Cole Porter's Broadway musical Paris, in 1928 and broadcast on KFWB, Hollywood, California, circa 1929.

In 1933, Irving Aaronson and his Commanders recorded for the Vocalion Records label. In 1934 and 1935, they recorded for the Columbia Records label. It is difficult to evaluate these records as they have never been reissued, but fortunately, some of them have been uploaded onto the Internet in recent years; including the song “Let’s Be Thankful”.

In 1935, Aaronson headlined the Irving Aaronson Orchestra radio program on NBC. The band toured movie theatres and ballrooms across America. Aaronson's band included at various times such musicians as Phil Saxe, Joe Gillespie, and others who would become bandleaders themselves: Artie Shaw, Gene Krupa, and Tony Pastor. Western movie actor Fuzzy Knight was a drummer with Aaronson's band in the late 1920s.

In 1939 Billy Mann, a successful investor who had been a founding member of the Yacht Club Boys musical quartet, bought the Irving Aaronson band outright. Aaronson remained as the pianist, but only briefly; in 1940, he joined the Metro-Goldwyn-Mayer film studio as a musical director. He remained in that capacity and served as assistant to producer Joe Pasternak until his death from a heart attack in 1963.

Some sources suggest his retirement at age 65, others have him active until his death.

Personal life and final years
Aaronson died in Hollywood of a heart attack in 1963, at 68 years old. He was interred at Hillside Memorial Park Cemetery.

References

Other sources
 Clarke, Donald. The Penguin encyclopedia of popular music, Viking, 1989.
 Larkin, Colin. The encyclopedia of popular music, third edition. Macmillan, 1998.
 Sies, Luther F. Encyclopedia of American Radio, 1920-1960, McFarland, 2000.

External links
[ Irving Aaronson] at AllMusic
Irving Aaronson at the Red Hot Jazz Archive
 
Irving Aaronson at Discography of American Historical Recordings
  

American jazz pianists
American male pianists
American jazz bandleaders
Musicians from New York (state)
1895 births
1963 deaths
Burials at Hillside Memorial Park Cemetery
Victor Records artists
Columbia Records artists
20th-century American conductors (music)
20th-century American pianists
20th-century American male musicians
American male jazz musicians